Satun Provincial Administrative Organization Stadium is a multi-purpose stadium in Satun Province, Thailand. It is currently used mostly for football matches and is the home stadium of Satun F.C. The stadium holds 5,000 people.

Football venues in Thailand
Multi-purpose stadiums in Thailand
Buildings and structures in Satun province
Sport in Satun province